Mortąg  (German Mortung) is a village in the administrative district of Gmina Stary Dzierzgoń, within Sztum County, Pomeranian Voivodeship, in northern Poland.

The village has a population of 220.

References

Villages in Sztum County